Majid Habibi (born 30 December 1981) is an Iranian voice actor. 

He is known for Persian voice acting for films, animations, documentaries, video games, film trailers, television advertisements, radio advertisements, network promotions, radio or audio dramas, puppet shows, audiobooks and television programs.

He graduated from Soore University with a Bachelor of Arts in Cultural Management.

Biography 
From a very early age, he showed an interest in learning martial arts such as Judo, Kyokushin, Pro Wrestling, and Wado-Ryu Karate. And then as a young adult, he started to practice Wushu by the famous coaches, Mohammad PourGholami and Masoud Jafari. Due to strong desire for this martial art, he kept on practicing for years and achieved considerable success and became champion and vice-champion in 2000 and 2001 in the state championship. He was also considered as a coach and judge.
In his early thirties, as his heart was filled with longing for dubbing art, he joined the Glory Dubbing Group, while he suffered from slipped disc and had to quit his favorite sport; and that was a time of great sorrow for him. But the attraction of dubbing was so great that he could decrease his sadness and try his best to learn more and more and get experience of it. Admitting that there are thousands of ways to reach the goal, he believes in divine Providence.

Voice actor roles  
Habibi's major roles are as following:
 Ted Templeton Jr. / Boss Baby in The Boss Baby: Family Business (2021)
 Chief Benja in Raya and the Last Dragon (2021)
 Lance Sterling in Spies in Disguise (2019)
 MufasaThe Lion King (2019 film) 
 Mighty Eagle in The Angry Birds Movie 2 (2019)
Snowball The Secret Life of Pets 2 (2019)
 Boss Baby in The Boss Baby (2017).
 Snowball The Secret Life of Pets (2016)
 Shere Khan in The Jungle Book (2016)
Mighty Eagle in The Angry Birds Movie (2016)
Top Cat Top Cat Begins (2015).
 Marcel in Rio (2011).
 Lord Shen (Gary Oldman) in Kung Fu Panda 2 (2011)
 Gobber the Belch in How to Train Your Dragon (2010)
 Megamind  in Megamind (2010).
 General W.R. Monger in Monsters vs. Aliens (2009)
Lightning McQueen in Cars (2006)
 Mandi in Ice Age: The Meltdown (2006)
 Superman in Superman returns (2006).
 Keanu Reeves & Woody Harrelson in A Scanner Darkly (2006).
 Otis in Barnyard & Back at the Barnyard (2006).
 Fly in The Ant Bully (2006)
Troy in Shark Bait (2006)
 Shaw in Open season (2006).
 Bones in Monster House (2006)
 Jamie Foxx in Stealth (2005)
 Eamonn Walker in Duma (2005).
 Zuko in Avatar: The Last Airbender (2005) 
 Frankie in Shark Tale (2004)
 El Cid in El Cid: The Legend (2003)
 Ryan in Final Fantasy: The Spirits Within (2001)
 Tarzan in Tarzan (1999)

Dub director 

 The Secret Garden (1993)
 A Little Princess (1995)
 The Living Forest (2001).
 Jester Till (2003)
 Stealth (2005)
 The Fox and the Hound 2 (2006)
 Phoebe in Wonderland (2008)
 Inside Job (2010 film) (2010)
 Ice Age: Continental Drift (2012).
 Street Fighter (Video game series)

Book 
Majid Habibi has also written a book about Voice acting in 2017 (solar calendar: 1396) in the name of Sedabazigar.

Filmography 
 Battle of the Kings: Rostam & Sohrab (2012). Sohrab And Afrasiab Voices.   
 Paat (2013). Dub director
 Fish & Cat (2013). Narrator
 Red Carpet (2013). Dub director
 360 Degree (2015). Voice actor

Theater performance
 Zoro (2014). Voice actor, live voice acting.
 Red and the Others (2014).
 Afra, or the Day Passes (2016).

Video game 
 Farmandeh (2018).
 Shabgard (2014).
 Combat in the gulf of Aden (2012)
 Zolfaghar (2012)
 Orient: A Hero's Heritage (2008).

Discography

Awards and nominations

Nominated for the best voice actor in first dubbing festival 2012 
Best voice actor in second dubbing festival 2013 
Best voice actor in third dubbing festival and nominated for the best dub director 2014

See also 
 Mehrdad Raissi Ardali

References

External links 
 
 

Soore University alumni
Iranian male voice actors
Iranian voice directors
Living people
1981 births
Iranian Kurdish people
People from Sanandaj
Wadō-ryū practitioners